Pycsw is an OGC APIRecords and CSW server implementation written in Python.

Background 

pycsw fully implements the OGC APIRecords and OpenGIS Catalogue Service Implementation Specification [Catalogue Service for the Web]. Initial development started in 2010 (more formally announced in 2011). The project is certified OGC Compliant, and is an OGC Reference Implementation. Since 2015, pycsw is an official OSGeo Project.

pycsw allows for the publishing and discovery of geospatial metadata via numerous APIs (CSW 2/CSW 3, OpenSearch, OAI-PMH, SRU). Existing repositories of geospatial metadata can also be exposed, providing a standards-based metadata and catalogue component of spatial data infrastructures.

Deployment 

pycsw is used in government, academia and industry, and powers the geoplatform.gov and data.gov CSW services. Data.gov is the home of the U.S. Government’s open data. pycsw can be deployed both as a standalone and embedded component in geospatial data portal applications such as CKAN, GeoNode, and Open Data Catalog.

History 
 2010: Initial development started
 2011
 June: 1.0.0 released, providing support for OGC Core CSW, ISO Application Profile, and INSPIRE Discovery Services
 2012
 April: 1.2.0 released, adding OpenSearch, SRU, WMS harvesting, GeoNode connectivity, JSON output, and MySQL backend support
 September: 1.4.0 released, adding WSGI and Open Data Catalogue connectivity
 November: featured in OSGeo journal
 2013
 January
 pycsw becomes certified OGC Compliant
 pycsw becomes an OGC reference implementation 
 April
 pycsw enters OSGeo Incubation
 June
 pycsw workshop provided by Gateway Geomatics for the Oregon Coastal Management Program (~ 40 participants)
 1.6.0 released, providing support for native PostGIS geometry support, spatial relevance ranking, WAF/RDF Dublin Core harvesting, ISO 19115-2, flexible administration
 August
 pycsw integrated into CKAN
 September
 New website launched, including blog, mobile support, bootstrap UI
 FOSS4G2013: pycsw part of 5 presentations, including Metadata Publishing Just Got Easier, as well as Maps and Metadata BOF
 2014
 March
 1.8.0 released, providing support for PostgreSQL Full Text Search, repository filtering, database connection pooling
 1.8.0 deployed by Data.gov and Geoplatform.gov as CSW API
 April
 Project Steering Committee (PSC) formed
 September
 1.10.0 released at FOSS4G PDX, providing support for OGC OpenSearch Geo/Time, OAI-PMH
 2015
 March
 pycsw graduates OSGeo incubation and is approved as an official OSGeo project
 2016
 July
 2.0.0 "Doug" released, providing support for CSW 3.0.0 and Python 3 support
 2018
 March
 2.2.0 released, adding WMS 1.3.0 and WPS process harvesting as well as plugin support enhancements
 2019
 May
 2.4.0 released, harvesting enhancements, paging improvements, new logos/branding
 2020
 December
 pycsw turns 10 years old
 2.6.0 released, OpenSearch updates, cloud enhancements, 12 factor support, CRS enhancements, drop Python 2 support

See also 
 Homepage
 Source Code
 Live Deployments

References 

Free GIS software
Free software programmed in Python
Web applications